State Route 102 (SR 102) is a north-south state highway located on Mount Desert Island in eastern Maine.  As of 2007, its southern terminus is located at an intersection with SR 102A in Tremont on the southern part of the island.  Its northern terminus is at intersection with SR 3 in Bar Harbor, a terminus it shares with SR 198.

Route description

SR 102 begins in the south at the intersection of Harbor Drive and Tremont Road in Tremont. SR 102A also has its signed northern terminus (geographically western) at this intersection.  SR 102 runs due north, entering Southwest Harbor and intersecting the other end of SR 102A south of the town center.  Continuing north, SR 102 enters the town of Mount Desert and Acadia National Park. Near Somesville, SR 102 intersects its former western loop on the island and later intersects SR 3/SR 198 near the Mount Desert Campground.  SR 3 has its eastern terminus at this intersection, but is generally not assigned cardinal directions as it loops the eastern half Mount Desert Island in order to avoid confusion. Heading north, SR 102 is concurrent with SR 198 as the two routes enter the northwestern corner of Bar Harbor.  Just before reaching Thompson Island in on the Trenton town line, the highway meets up with SR 3 once again.  SR 102 and SR 198 both terminate at this intersection, with SR 3 continuing north (signed west) onto the Maine mainland.

History

SR 102 was originally designated in 1925 and ran between Augusta and Belfast.  It has also maintained most of its routing through Mount Desert, but most of the old route was later superseded by the designation of SR 3. SR 102 was overlapped with SR 3 in Trenton and Ellsworth until 1946, when it was truncated to run between Seal Cove and its current northern terminus at SR 3 in Bar Harbor.

In 1951, the southern portion of the route was extended, causing SR 102 to loop around the island clockwise along Tremont Road and Pretty Marsh Road and terminate at itself near Somes Pond, creating a lasso-shaped route in which one could be traveling due north on a road signed "south".  SR 102 signage was removed from the western half of the loop in 2007, truncating SR 102 to the terminus of SR 102A in Tremont, leaving the rest of the loop unnumbered and referred to by the name Pretty Marsh Road.  It was also removed from the official Acadia National Park map to match, though older Park signage at some intersections does still refer to Route 102 on this unsigned portion.

Junction list

Suffixed route

State Route 102A

SR 102A is a loop of SR 102 on the southeastern tip of Mount Desert Island.

It forms a nearly complete loop and, for the most part, lacks cardinal directions on guide signs. One exception is present in Tremont, where the first guide sign after departing from SR 102 indicates SR 102A south, although from this point the route also turns east, north, and west en route to Southwest Harbor.

Junction list

References

External links

Floodgap Roadgap's RoadsAroundME: Maine State Route 102
Floodgap Roadgap's RoadsAroundME: Maine State Route 102A

102
Transportation in Hancock County, Maine